Timeline of anthropology, 1960–1969

Events

The Southern Anthropological Society is founded.

Publications
1960
Worker In The Cane; A Puerto Rican Life History by Sidney Mintz

1961
Ishi in Two Worlds, by Theodora Kroeber
Rethinking Anthropology, by Edmund Leach
The Forest People, by Colin Turnbull

Births

Deaths
1960
John Sydenham Furnivall
Zora Neale Hurston
Clyde Kluckhohn
Alfred L. Kroeber

1961
Frantz Fanon
John Peabody Harrington

References

Anthropology by decade
Anthropology
Anthropology timelines